Franco Evangelisti may refer to:

Franco Evangelisti (composer) (1926–1980), Italian composer and sound theorist
Franco Evangelisti (politician) (1923–1993), Italian politician